The Church of Saint Mary of the Germans was a Catholic church, built in Romanesque style, now in ruins, located in the Old City of Jerusalem on the northeast slope of Mount Zion.

It was in 1126, after the First Crusade, when a German pilgrim and his wife, whose names are unknown, founded a hospice for pilgrims from the Holy Roman Empire. He joined the Hospice of St. John of Jerusalem. Celestine II sets the rules in 1143, taking the hospital under his protection, but with a right of prior review of the Order of St. John. The building was partly destroyed by the attacks of 1187, and rebuilt in 1229. Frederick II assigned it to the Teutonic Knights in April 1229, but then it went to the Order of St. John by order of Pope Gregory IX. As a result of the capture of Jerusalem in 1244, the hospice and church were left in ruins.

The ruins were discovered in 1872 by T. Drake. They are now partially open as part of a public archaeological park.

See also
Catholic Church in Israel
 Catholic Church in Palestine
St. Mary's Church (disambiguation)

References

Churches in Jerusalem
Ancient churches in the Holy Land
Church buildings in the Kingdom of Jerusalem
Mary oftheGermans
Jerusalem Mary oftheGermans
Jerusalem Mary oftheGermans